Aroona Palace is the debut album by Melbourne band Tinpan Orange. It was recorded at Sing Sing Studios and Aroona Palace, and was self released in 2005. It was rereleased on 9 April 2009 due to popular demand.

Track listing
"Waterfall" - 4:15
"Worthy" - 4:33
"Passing Time" - 4:00
"House on My Belly" - 4:45
"Wait of the World" - 3:46
"Beatific" - 3:01
"Sleep Away" - 4:20
"Girls Blues" - 4:10
"Lost and Found" - 3:40
"Angel Lily Princess Girl" - 3:50
"Untitled" - 0:16
"Song for Jane" - 4:56
"Dance Me to the End of Love" - 4:10

Personnel

Band members
Emily Lubitz – vocals, guitar
Jesse Lubitz – guitar, vocals
Alex Burkoy - violin, mandolin, guitar
Peter Jones - drums, percussion

Technical staff
Jimi Maroudas - producer and engineer
Tony "Jack the Bear" Mantz - mastering
Victor Holder - photography, artwork
Lia Gery - photography

References

2005 debut albums
Tinpan Orange albums